The Shanghai Aircraft Design and Research Institute (SADRI), previously known as Shanghai Aircraft Research Institute (SARI), is a Chinese design institute, part of the ACAC consortium. Founded in the 1970s as First Aircraft Design Institute Shanghai Branch it became a part of ACAC in 2002 and was renamed Shanghai Aircraft Design and Research Institute in 2009.  The design institute's head office is located at 5 Yunjin Road next to Longhua Airport in the Xuhui District of  Shanghai.

SADRI has done liaison engineering and airworthiness test for MD-82 and MD-90 airliners.

Products

 Shanghai Y-10 - airliner
 Shaanxi Y-8 - co-designed reversed engineered transport aircraft with Shaanxi Aircraft Corporation
 ARJ21 - Regional jet airliner 
 C919 - Narrow-body jet airliner

References

Aerospace companies of China
Companies with year of establishment missing